John Lawrence Russell (January 3, 1921 – January 19, 1991) was an American film and television actor, most noted for his starring role as Marshal Dan Troop in the  ABC western television series Lawman from 1958 to 1962 and his lead role as international adventurer Tim Kelly in the syndicated TV series Soldiers of Fortune from 1955 to 1957.

Early life
Born in Los Angeles to insurance company executive John Henry Russell and his wife, Amy Requa, John Lawrence Russell was the eldest of three children. He attended the University of California, Los Angeles (UCLA) as a student athlete.

Following the start of World War II, he joined the United States Marine Corps, though he was initially rejected because of his height.  He was commissioned as a 2d Lieutenant on November 11, 1942, and was assigned to the 6th Marine Regiment. His division was sent to Guadalcanal, where he served as an assistant intelligence officer. He contracted malaria and returned home with a medical discharge.

Career

Russell signed a contract with 20th Century Fox in 1945 and made his first film appearance as a guard in A Royal Scandal. He played several supporting parts while at Fox, acting the role of a junior law partner in the Clifton Webb comedy Sitting Pretty (1948) as well as a navy pilot in Slattery's Hurricane (1949). He primarily played secondary roles, often in western films, including William A. Wellman's 1948 Yellow Sky. Later, however, he signed with Republic Pictures, where he was cast in a starring role opposite Judy Canova in Oklahoma Annie (1952).

In 1955, Russell landed the lead role in a television drama series called  Soldiers of Fortune. This half-hour syndicated adventure show placed him and his sidekick (played by Chick Chandler) in a dangerous setting each week. While the show proved popular with young boys, it did not draw enough adult viewers to its prime slot and was canceled in 1957. That same year, he returned to films briefly to appear as a corrupt agricultural magnate in the Warner Brothers low-budget exploitation film Untamed Youth. A year later he returned to the small screen as gunslinger Matt Reardon, in "The Empty Gun" episode of the ABC/Warners western series, Cheyenne, starring Clint Walker. In 1958 Russell appeared as Saylor Hornbook on Cheyenne in the episode titled "Dead to Rights".

In 1958, Russell was cast in his best-known role: the stolid, taciturn Marshal Dan Troop, the lead character in Lawman, an ABC/Warners hit western series that ran for four years. Co-starring alongside Peter Brown, who played Deputy Johnny McKay, and Peggie Castle as Birdcage Saloon owner Lily Merrill, Russell portrayed a US frontier peace officer mentoring his younger compatriot.

Russell also appeared in other motion pictures for Warner Bros., notably as a Sioux chieftain in Yellowstone Kelly (1959), as well as a rich, corrupt cattle rancher, Nathan Burdette, in the highly successful Howard Hawks western Rio Bravo (1959), starring John Wayne.

At the same time, Russell guest-starred in an episode of NBC's adventure series Northwest Passage. In 1969, Russell appeared in five episodes of the Robert Wagner series, It Takes a Thief: "Guess Who's Coming To Rio?" (January 9, 1969), "Saturday Night In Venice" (September 25, 1969), "The Blue, Blue Danube" (October 30, 1969), "Payoff In The Piazza" (November 13, 1969) and "A Friend In Deed" (November 27, 1969).

Throughout the remainder of his movie career, he played secondary roles in more than 20 films, including several A.C. Lyles westerns and three films directed by his friend Clint Eastwood, most notably as Marshal Stockburn, the chief villain in Eastwood's 1985 film Pale Rider.

Russell also appeared in the second season of the Filmation children's science-fiction series Jason of Star Command. He played Commander Stone, a blue-skinned alien from Alpha Centauri. He replaced James Doohan, who had played the commander in the previous season, but left to start working on Star Trek: The Motion Picture (1979).

Death
Russell died of complications from emphysema in 1991 and was interred in the Los Angeles National Cemetery, a U.S. Department of Veterans Affairs cemetery in Los Angeles. 

He married Renata Titus in 1943. They had three children, and divorced in 1965. He married again in 1970 to Lavergne Warner Pearson but was divorced the following year.

Complete filmography

A Royal Scandal (1945) – Guard (uncredited)
A Bell for Adano (1945) – Capt. Anderson (uncredited)
Within These Walls (1945) – Rogers
The Dark Corner (1946) – Policeman at Tony's Apartment (uncredited)
Somewhere in the Night (1946) – Marine Captain (uncredited)
Three Little Girls in Blue (1946) – Young Man at Party (uncredited)
Forever Amber (1947) – Black Jack Mallard
Sitting Pretty (1948) – Bill Philby
Yellow Sky (1948) – Lengthy
Slattery's Hurricane (1949) – Lt. 'Hobbie' Hobson
The Gal Who Took the West (1949) – Grant O'Hara
The Story of Molly X (1949) – Cash Brady
Undertow (1949) – Danny Morgan
Saddle Tramp (1950) – Rocky
Frenchie (1950) – Lance Cole
The Fat Man (1951) – Gene Gordon
Fighting Coast Guard (1951) – Barney Walker
The Barefoot Mailman (1951) – Theron
Man in the Saddle (1951) – Hugh Clagg
Oklahoma Annie (1952) – Dan Fraser
Hoodlum Empire (1952) – Joe Gray
The Sun Shines Bright (1953) – Ashby Corwin
Fair Wind to Java (1953) – Flint
Jubilee Trail (1954) – Oliver Hale
Hell's Outpost (1954) – Ben Hodes
The Last Command (1955) – Lt. Dickinson
Untamed Youth (1957) – Russ Tropp
Hell Bound (1957) – Jordan
The Dalton Girls (1957) – W.T. 'Illinois' Grey
Fort Massacre (1958) – Pvt. Robert W. Travis
Rio Bravo (1959) – Nathan Burdette
Yellowstone Kelly (1959) – Gall
Daniel Boone (1965) – Amos McAleer
Apache Uprising (1965) – Vance Buckner
Hostile Guns (1967) – Aaron Pleasant
Fort Utah (1967) – Eli Jonas
Buckskin (1968) – Patch
Fireball Jungle (1968) – Nero Solitarius
If He Hollers, Let Him Go! (1968) – Sheriff
Noon Sunday (1970) – Darmody
Cannon for Cordoba (1970) – John J. Pershing
Blood Legacy (1971) – Frank Mantee
Smoke in the Wind (1975) – Cagle Mondier
Fugitive Lovers (1975) – Harris Alexander
The Outlaw Josey Wales (1976) – Bloody Bill Anderson
Where the Wind Dies (1976)
Mission to Glory: A True Story (1977) – Capt. Solis
Uncle Scam (1981) – Art
Six Tickets to Hell (1981) 
Honkytonk Man (1982) – Jack Wade
Pale Rider (1985) – Marshal Stockburn
Under the Gun (1988) – Simon Stone (final film role)

References

External links

Unofficial Lawman Western TV Series Homepage

American male film actors
American male television actors
Male Western (genre) film actors
United States Marine Corps officers
United States Marine Corps personnel of World War II
Male actors from Los Angeles
Warner Bros. contract players
Deaths from emphysema
1921 births
1991 deaths
Burials at Los Angeles National Cemetery
20th Century Studios contract players
20th-century American male actors
Western (genre) television actors